Hush is the second studio album by South Korean-Chinese girl group Miss A. The album and music video called "Hush" was released on November 6, 2013, and contains thirteen songs including seven entirely new songs.

"Hush" served as its lead single.
"Come On Over" served to continue the promotion of the album in China and ended in Korea.
"Hide & Sick" was released in January 2014.
"Love Is U" was used to ended the promotion of the album.

Track listing

Charts

Album chart

Song chart

References

External links
 "Hush" music video on YouTube
 Official Website

2013 albums
Miss A albums
JYP Entertainment albums
Genie Music albums
Korean-language albums